The Bristol Lodekka was a half-cab low-height step-free double-decker bus built by Bristol Commercial Vehicles in England. It was the first production bus design to have no step up from the passenger entrance throughout the lower deck; although Gilford and Leyland Motors had developed low floor city buses in the 1930s, these did not enter production.

Design and development
The point of its design and introduction was to end the uncomfortable and inconvenient Lowbridge double-deck bus layout, replacing it by lowering the chassis frame and integrating it with the body and fitting a drop-centre rear axle, so that there were no steps from the rear entrance platform to the front of the passenger gangway, itself sunk about 10 cm (4 inches) below the seating platforms on the LDX, LD and first five LDLs. A full flat floor  was developed on the last LDL, then used on the LDS and the F series Lodekkas. Bristol Commercial Vehicles, Eastern Coach Works and some of their employees obtained a number of patents relating to the design.

Bristol manufactured over 5,200 Lodekkas between 1949 and 1968 as a standard double-deck vehicle for the UK state-owned bus sector. With all examples bodied by Eastern Coach Works in Lowestoft, they have a traditional half-cab design and a lower floor level allowing a low overall height. The earlier LD-series and the later FL and FS had a rear platform, but the FSF and FLF had a forward (behind the front axle and driver's position, rather than 'front' ahead of the front axle and alongside the driver) entrance. Most were powered by five- or six-cylinder Gardner engines, with a small number having a Bristol or Leyland power unit.

An engineering option was designed to reduce the power loss due to engine radiator fan operation and to increase the heat available for heating of the passengers.  After experiments by Wing-Commander T.R. Cave-Browne-Cave (CBC), Professor of Engineering at Southampton University, a satisfactory design was produced. The 'CBC' system involved two small engine radiators being placed above the driver's cab roof level at the front outer corners of the double deck to give maximum aerodynamic air flow. The engine coolant water was pumped around these instead of the traditional radiator.  In cold weather, all or a portion of the air passing through these radiators, was diverted by flaps, the left into the upper saloon and the right to the lower deck.  In hot weather, the flaps could be changed by push-pull levers in the driver's cab roof to divert all the hot air to the outside of the vehicle.  The movement of the vehicle was (usually) adequate to cool the engine without the need for a fan or radiator at the traditional position in front of the engine.  The traditional 'radiator' grille at the front of the vehicle was not required, but was usually retained (with a few exceptions) and blanked off behind. 'Varivane' wax capsule operated shutters were fitted in front of the upper radiators to keep the coolant at optimum temperature.  There were some disadvantages to the scheme and eventually customers stopped specifying it.

The first prototype vehicle (chassis no. LDX001) was operated by Bristol Tramways & Carriage Company Ltd Ltd who designed and made the chassis at its 'MCW' (Motor Constructional Works) which at that time was still an integral part of the company. It was allocated fleet no. LC5000 and registered LHY 949. There is a story that the first vehicle originally had two separate propshafts – one to each rear wheel, with the differential at the front of the vehicle.  This was soon changed to incorporate the differential into the off-side gear train - a concept still used today by several international bus manufacturers.

West Yorkshire Road Car Company had the second prototype Lodekka (chassis no. LDX002), originally fleet number 822 but renumbered DX1 under the April 1954 renumbering scheme, registered JWT 712, which operated in the Harrogate area. It lacked the distinctively stylish fairing of the production models. This bus was displayed at the Festival of Britain (South Bank Exhibition) in 1951.

Lodekka users in the UK included Brighton Hove & District, Bristol, Crosville, Cumberland, Eastern Counties, Eastern National, Hants & Dorset, Lincolnshire Road Car Co, Red & White Services, Scottish Omnibuses, Southern Vectis, South Wales, Luton & District, Thames Valley & Aldershot, United, United Counties, United Welsh, West Yorkshire Roadcar Co, Western National, Western Welsh, Central SMT and Wilts & Dorset. No Lodekkas were bought by any London-based companies, but they often worked into the capital on services operated by Thames Valley and Eastern National.

With the arrival of more modern "OMO" or one person operated buses, such as the Leyland Atlantean and Bristol VRT (the Lodekka's successor), many Lodekkas found themselves relegated to driver training duties. The urgency with which the National Bus Company wanted to convert operations to one man operated double deck vehicles led to the unusual exchange of 91 Lodekkas of the newest FLF type with a similar number of older Bristol VRT (rear engined and front entrance suitable for one man operation) double decks from the Scottish Bus Group which was keen to have the more reliable older design.  The exchange took place at the Carlisle (Willowholme) depot of Ribble Motor Services.

The Bristol Lodekka was also manufactured by Dennis under licence, and was sold as the Dennis Loline. This arrangement was necessary because the Bristol company was prohibited by law from selling its products at the time to anyone other than similar government-owned undertakings.  The design, though, was attractive to other operators, so this arrangement allowed them to purchase vehicles to the same design. Sometimes the Bristol Lodekka was offered as an open-top bus.

Chassis codes 

In accordance with Bristol Commercial Vehicles practice, chassis were designated by a two or three letter code, followed by the number of engine cylinders and engine manufacturer.
 LDX:    Low 'Decker, Experimental (the first two LD vehicles)
 LD:     Low 'Decker
Braking was improved from the earlier vacuum assisted to compressed air assisted)
 LDS:    Low 'Decker, Short (Essentially pre-production FS models)
 FS:     Flat-floor, Short length
 FSF:    Flat-floor, Short length, Forward entrance
 FL:     Flat-floor, Long
 FLF:    Flat-floor, Long, Forward entrance

Example engine classifications
 FS5G:   FS with Gardner 5LW engine
 FL6B:   FL with Bristol BVW engine (AVW type in Bristol LD6B)
 FLF6G:  FLF with Gardner 6LW or 6LX engine
 FLF6L:  FLF with Leyland O.600 or O.680 engine

Further use
Surrey-based Top Deck Travel converted approximately 100 to "decker home" caravan standard between 1973 and 1997, and used these buses on extended tours to Europe, Asia and North America.

In the early 1990s, Surrey based "Leisurelink" used a former Southern Vectis example (MDL 954) on a weekend-only tourist service, linking Gatwick Zoo (now closed), Gatwick Airport and the Bluebell Railway.

Some overseas operators acquired second-hand Bristol Lodekkas from the UK for further service. For example, Fok Lei Autocarro S.A of Macau operated a small number of Lodekkas between the 1970s and late 1980s. Citybus of Hong Kong operated one example in 1980s.

A charter/limousine company named Double Decker PDX in Portland, OR operates a refurbished Bristol Lodekka.

A bakery in Saratoga Springs, NY, named Bettie's Cakes, operates a Lodekka as a Double Decker Cupcake Stand affectionately named DeeDee.

A number of Lodekkas were used during the 1970s by the British engineering consortium Atomic Power Construction (APC) for transporting workers to and from work during the building and running of Dungeness A and Dungeness B nuclear power stations.

Popular culture
In popular culture, Bristol Lodekkas featured extensively in the early-1970s London Weekend Television series On the Buses, with actor Reg Varney driving and Bob Grant his conductor. One of these Lodekkas has been preserved.

A Hungry Horse pub named The Lodekka stands near the former site of the Bristol Commercial Vehicles factory.

See also 

 List of buses

References 

Lodekka
Buses of the United Kingdom
Double-decker buses
Half-cab buses
Low-floor buses
Open-top buses